Christine Peji Bersola-Babao (born October 30, 1970), known professionally as Tin Tin, is a Filipina multi-media personality. She is best known for starring in the educational television program Sine'skwela.

Life and career

Christine Bersola-Babao is considered a "Celebrity Mother".

Controversy

"Being Gay" interview article
on March 11, 2013, Christine Bersola-Babao published an article entitled "Being Gay" where she interviewed the television psychologist Camille Garcia, a Catholic conservative on what to do when a child is showing "signs" of being gay.

Dr. Camille stated: “Arrest the situation, ’yun ang tama (that is the right thing to do). But most parents encourage the situation; Tatanggapin agad (they gladly accept the situation). Let’s be moral in making the child understand the situation, di ba yun ang dapat (is it not the right way to do it). We tell our child, ‘Anak, mali ito’” (translated from Filipino as "son, that is wrong").

Bersola-Babao added her method of raising her three-year-old son, Nio.

"As a mom who has a three-year-old son named Nio, my personal take on the matter is this: Nio, when curious, plays with his big sister’s toys. But we always point it out to him that those are toys for girls, and these are toys for boys. We compare toys so that he will understand."

Bersola-Babao's article became a trending topic in social website Twitter.

Her resource person Camille Garcia, only known for a local TV show, failed to cite peer reviewed studies to back her assumptions. The Psychological Association of the Philippines noted that this ran counter to the professional and ethical commitments of the Psychological Profession.

An excerpt from the statement of the Psychological Association of the Philippines states:

Public reaction
Bersola-Babao and Dr. Camille Garcia's statements received criticism from Filipino netizens.

Political party reaction
The Ang Ladlad political party reacted to the article on March 13, 2013, stating that the “moral condemnation of same-sex relations is unfortunate, and her advice to parents on how to deal with their effeminate sons is wrong-headed, woefully inadequate, and potentially damaging.”

The group reminded Babao that “outdated and destructive gender stereotypes are not helpful and can have adverse effects on children’s sexual orientation and gender identity development.”

Awards and nominations

References

External links
Being gay | Entertainment, News, The Philippine Star

1970 births
Living people
ABS-CBN News and Current Affairs people
Filipino Roman Catholics
Filipino radio journalists
Filipino television journalists
Filipino women journalists
Filipino YouTubers
News5 people
People from Bulacan
Star Magic
University of the Philippines Diliman alumni
Women television journalists
Women radio journalists